The National Technological University – Concepción del Uruguay Regional Faculty (Castilian: Universidad Tecnológica Nacional - Facultad Regional Concepción del Uruguay (UTN-FRCU)).

Careers

Degrees
 Engineering:
 Civil Engineering
 Electrical Engineering
 Industrial Engineering
 Mechanical Engineering
 Naval Engineering
 Chemical Engineering
 Information Systems Engineering
 Biomedical Engineering

Postgraduate Degrees
 Magisters:
 Magister in Ambiental Engineering
 Magister in Food Technology
 Specializations:
 Specialization in Work Hygiene and Safety
 Laboural Engineering
 Specialization in Food Technology

History 

This NTU College is one of the 24 regional faculties of the Universidad Tecnológica Nacional of Argentina.

Sources 

 

 Official website

Concepcion del Uruguay